Tax returns in the United States are reports filed with the Internal Revenue Service (IRS) or with the state or local tax collection agency (California Franchise Tax Board, for example) containing information used to calculate income tax or other taxes. Tax returns are generally prepared using forms prescribed by the IRS or other applicable taxing authority.

Federal returns

Under the Internal Revenue Code returns can be classified as either tax returns or information returns, although the term "tax return" is sometimes used to describe both kinds of returns in a broad sense. Tax returns, in the more narrow sense, are reports of tax liabilities and payments, often including financial information used to compute the tax. A very common federal tax form is IRS Form 1040.

A tax return provides information so that the taxation authority can check on the taxpayer's calculations, or can determine the amount of tax owed if the taxpayer is not required to calculate that amount. In contrast, an information return is a declaration by some person, such as a third party, providing economic information about one or more potential taxpayers.

Information returns
Information returns are reports used to transmit information about income, receipts or other matters that may affect tax liabilities. For example, Form W-2 and Form 1099 are used to report on the amount of income that an employer, independent contractor, broker, or other payer pays to a taxpayer. A company, employer, or party which has paid income (or, in a few cases, proceeds that may ultimately be determined not to be income) to a taxpayer is required to file the applicable information return directly with the IRS. A copy of the information return is also sent directly to the payee. These procedures enable the IRS to make reasonably sure that taxpayers report income correctly.

Tax returns
The filing of Federal tax returns is required under federal law. Individuals who receive more than the statutory minimum amount of gross income must file. The standard U.S. individual tax return is Form 1040. There are several variations of this form, such as the 1040EZ and the 1040A, as well as many supplemental forms. U.S. citizens and residents who realize gross income in excess of a specified amount (adjusted annually for inflation) are required by law to file Federal income tax returns (and pay remaining income taxes if applicable). Gross income includes most kinds of income regardless of whether the income arises from legitimate businesses. Income from the sale of illegal drugs, for example, is taxable. Many criminals, such as Al Capone, are indicted not only for their non-tax crimes, but for failure to file Federal income tax returns (and pay income taxes).

Many Americans find the process of filling out the tax forms more onerous than paying the taxes themselves. A recent survey by Credello uncovered that only 13% of Americans file their taxes completely on their own and 53% rely on an online software system. Many companies offer free and paid options for reducing the tedious labor involved in preparing one's tax return.

Preparation

TurboTax is the most popular tax preparation software in the United States, holding a 66.6% market share of self-prepared returns in 2018. H&R Block at Home (formerly TaxCut) is the second most popular with a 14% share. Other popular tax software includes: TaxACT at 7%, Tax Hawk (including FreeTaxUSA) at 5.9%, Credit Karma's free tax software (now owned by Intuit/TurboTax) at 1.7%, and TaxSlayer at 1.5%.

In some countries, the tax agency provides a prefilled return to streamline the process, but the United States has failed to adopt these technologies as of 2013 after lobbying by tax preparation companies like Intuit. A similar reform was unsuccessfully attempted in California, after a pilot known as ReadyReturn.

Deadline
The annual deadline to file one's Federal individual income tax return is April 15. The IRS lists scenarios for which Tax Day does not follow this standard deadline - Taxpayers can file an extension where the taxes owed must be paid by April 15 but the completed tax return filed by October 15.

Proof of timely filing

Amended return
A taxpayer who finds a mistake on a previously filed individual income tax return can file corrections with Form 1040X.

In the United States, taxpayers may file an amended return with the Internal Revenue Service to correct errors reported on a previously paid tax return. Typically a taxpayer does not need to file an amended return if he or she has math errors as the IRS will make the necessary corrections. For individuals, amended returns are filed using Form 1040X, Amended U.S. Individual Income Tax Return. In some cases taxpayers may use Form 1045, for example, to carry back a Net Operating Loss to a prior tax period. Form 1045 is generally processed much faster than Form 1040X.

Privacy and public disclosure
Tax return laws generally prohibit disclosure of any information gathered on a state tax return. Likewise, the federal government may not (with certain exceptions) disclose tax return information without the filer's permission, and each federal agency is also limited in how it can share such information with other federal agencies.

Occasionally there have been efforts in Congress to require tax returns to be open to public inspection. For example, Senators Robert M. La Follette and George W. Norris supported such legislation, applicable to both individual and corporate returns, and public disclosure for wealthy taxpayers was required from 1923–1926. Presidential candidates have sometimes voluntarily released their tax returns.

The IRS occasionally has seen "Fifth Amendment" returns from people who accurately report their annual income and tax liability but refuse to reveal the source of the funds on the grounds that such a statement would tend to incriminate the individual.

List of common forms

Examples of common Federal tax returns (and, where noted, information returns) include:

Transfer taxes

Form 706, U.S. Estate Tax Return;
Form 709, U.S. Gift (and Generation-Skipping Transfer) Tax Return;

Statutory excise taxes

Form 720, Quarterly Federal Excise Tax Return;
Form 2290, Heavy Vehicle Use Tax Return;
Form 5330, Return of Excise Taxes Related to Employee Benefit Plans;

Employment (payroll) taxes

Form 940, Employer's Annual Federal Unemployment (FUTA) Tax Return;
Form 941, Employer's Quarterly Federal Tax Return;

Income taxes

Form 1040, U.S. Individual Income Tax Return;
Form 1040A, U.S. Individual Income Tax Return;
Form 1040EZ, Income Tax Return for Single and Joint Filers with No Dependents;
Form 1041, U.S. Income Tax Return for Estates and Trusts (for 1993 and prior years, this was known as "U.S. Fiduciary Income Tax Return");
Form 1065, U.S. Return of Partnership Income (for 1999 and prior years, this was known as "U.S. Partnership Return of Income") (information return);
Form 1099 series (various titles) (information return);
Form W-2 (information return);
Form 1120, U.S. Corporation Income Tax Return;
Form 1120S, U.S. Income Tax Return for an S Corporation;
Form 2290, Heavy Highway Vehicle Use Tax Return;

See also
 Affordable Care Act tax provisions
 Taxation in the United States
 Tax return (Australia)
 Tax return (Canada)
 Tax return (United Kingdom)

References

External links
Federal laws requiring the filing of income tax returns:

Taxation in the United States
 Tax return (United States)
Tax forms